Palo Alto is a collection of linked short stories by American actor, writer, and director James Franco. The collection was published on October 19, 2010, by Scribner's. The stories are about teenagers and their experiments with vices and their struggles with their families. The book is named after his hometown of Palo Alto, California, and is dedicated to many of the writers he worked with at Brooklyn College. Inspired by some of Franco's own teenage memories, and memories written and submitted by high school students at Palo Alto Senior High School, the stories describe life in Palo Alto as experienced by a series of teenagers who spend most of their time indulging in driving drunk, using drugs and taking part in unplanned acts of violence. Each passage is told by a young narrator.

Adaptations
The film adaptation of the book stars its author, James Franco, Emma Roberts, Jack Kilmer, Nat Wolff, Zoe Levin, Claudia Levy, Chris Messina, Keegan Allen, Talia Shire, and Don Novello. The film is written and directed by Gia Coppola. The 2015 film Yosemite, written and directed by Gabrielle Demeestere and starring James Franco, was based on two stories from this book as well. The 2015 film Memoria, written and directed by Vladimir de Fontenay and Nina Ljeti and again starring Franco, was based in part on this book and in part on Franco's 2013 book, A California Childhood. The 2014 film Killing Animals, directed by Javier Bosques, Steven Huffaker, Shirley Kim-Ryu, Sarah Kruchowski, Eben Portnoy, and Andrew Wesman, was based on six of the stories from this book.

Critical response 
The book received mixed reviews. The Los Angeles Times called it "the work of an ambitious young man who clearly loves to read, who has a good eye for detail, but who has spent way too much time on style and virtually none on substance." The Guardian said that Franco's "foray into the literary world may be met with cynicism in some quarters, but this is a promising debut from a most unlikely source." Writing in The New York Times, reviewer and fellow author Joshua Mohr praised Franco for how, in the story "American History", he juxtaposed historical parts with a present-day social commentary that "makes you wonder how much we've actually evolved in post-bellum America."

Publishers Weekly reviewed the collection, stating, "The author fails to find anything remotely insightful to say in these 11 amazingly underwhelming stories."

References

2010 short story collections
American short story collections
Books adapted into films
San Francisco Bay Area literature